Ebijakara is a commune in Abi local government area of Cross River State, Nigeria.

History

Ebijakara is one of the original seven village which form the Bahumono nation and they migrated from Hotumusa along with other Bahumono communities.

Communal war

There have been a series of communal wars and conflicts in the area  between them and the neighboring Ebom community.

References

Villages in Cross River State